Ochre River station is a flag stop located in Ochre River, Manitoba. The station is served by Via Rail's Winnipeg – Churchill train.

References 

Via Rail stations in Manitoba